The 2021 Purdue Boilermakers baseball team was a baseball team that represented Purdue University in the 2021 NCAA Division I baseball season. The Boilermakers were members of the Big Ten Conference and played their home games at Alexander Field in West Lafayette, Indiana. They were led by second-year head coach Greg Goff.

Previous season
The Boilermakers finished the 2020 NCAA Division I baseball season 7–7 overall (0–0 conference) and eighth place in conference standings, as the season was cut short in stages by March 12 due to the COVID-19 pandemic.

Roster

Schedule

! style="" | Regular Season
|- valign="top"

|- bgcolor="#ccffcc"
| 1 || March 5 || vs Nebraska || Dell Diamond • Round Rock, Texas || 6–5 || Smeltz (1–0) || Schreiber (0–1) || None || 225 || 1–0 || 1–0
|- bgcolor="#ffcccc"
| 2 || March 6 || vs Nebraska || Dell Diamond • Round Rock, Texas || 2–7 || Hroch (1–0) || Schapira (0–1) || None || 225 || 1–1 || 1–1
|- bgcolor="#ffcccc"
| 3 || March 6 || vs Nebraska || Dell Diamond • Round Rock, Texas || 0–10 || Schanaman (1–0) || Alvarado (0–1) || None || 225 || 1–2 || 1–2
|- bgcolor="#ffcccc"
| 4 || March 7 || vs Nebraska || Dell Diamond • Round Rock, Texas || 0–4 || Schreiber (1–1) || Jackson (0–1) || None || 225 || 1–3 || 1–3
|- bgcolor="#ffcccc"
| 5 || March 12 || vs Michigan || Fluor Field at the West End • Greenville, South Carolina || 1–9 || Hajjar (1–0) || Johnson (0–1) || None || 225 || 1–4 || 1–4
|- bgcolor="#ffcccc"
| 6 || March 13 || vs Michigan || Fluor Field at the West End • Greenville, South Carolina || 0–4 || Weston (1–1) || Schapira (0–2) || None || 225 || 1–5 || 1–5
|- bgcolor="#ffcccc"
| 7 || March 13 || vs Michigan || Fluor Field at the West End • Greenville, South Carolina || 2–9 || Dragani (2–0) || Starnes (0–1) || None || 225 || 1–6 || 1–6
|- bgcolor="#ffcccc"
| 8 || March 14 || vs Michigan || Fluor Field at the West End • Greenville, South Carolina || 6–11 || Pace (1–0) || Daniel (0–1) || None || 225 || 1–7 || 1–7
|- bgcolor="#ffcccc"
| 9 || March 19 || at Indiana || Bart Kaufman Field • Bloomington, Indiana || 1–2 || Stahl (1–0) || Brooks (0–1) || Litwicki (3) || 225 || 1–8 || 1–8
|- bgcolor="#ccffcc"
| 10 || March 20 || at Indiana || Bart Kaufman Field • Bloomington, Indiana || 8–5 || Hildebrand (1–0) || Brown (2–1) || Daniel (1) || 150 || 2–8 || 2–8
|- bgcolor="#ffcccc"
| 11 || March 21 || at Indiana || Bart Kaufman Field • Bloomington, Indiana || 4–9 || Bierman (1–1) || Jackson (0–2) ||None || 150 || 2–9 || 2–9
|- bgcolor="#ffcccc"
| 12 || March 26 ||  || Alexander Field • West Lafayette, Indiana || 5–7 || Rutkowski (2–1) || Johnson (0–2) || None || 433 || 2–10 || 2–10
|- bgcolor="#ccffcc"
| 13 || March 27 || Rutgers || Alexander Field • West Lafayette, Indiana || 7–4 || Smeltz (2–0) || Fitzpatrick (0–1) || None || 505 || 3–10 || 3–10
|- bgcolor="#ffcccc"
| 14 || March 28 || Rutgers || Alexander Field • West Lafayette, Indiana || 4–15 || Teller (1–2) || Jackson (0–3) || None || 474 || 3–11 || 3–11
|-

|- bgcolor="#ffcccc"
| 15 || April 2 || Iowa || Alexander Field • West Lafayette, Indiana || 2–4 || Nedved (2–0) || Weins (0–1) || None || 479 || 3–12 || 3–12
|- bgcolor="#ccffcc"
| 16 || April 3 || Iowa || Alexander Field • West Lafayette, Indiana || 10–8 || Brooks (1–1) || Guzek (0–1) || Cook (1) || 496 || 4–12 || 4–12
|- bgcolor="#ffcccc"
| 17 || April 4 || Iowa || Alexander Field • West Lafayette, Indiana || 5–8 || Davitt (3–1) || Kulak (0–1) || None || 534 || 4–13 || 4–13
|- bgcolor="#ffcccc"
| 18 || April 10 || vs  || Drayton McLane Baseball Stadium at John H. Kobs Field • East Lansing, Michigan || 0–11 || Virbitsky (1–2) || Schapira (0–3) || None || 208 || 4–14 || 4–14
|- bgcolor="#ccffcc"
| 19 || April 11 || vs Penn State || Drayton McLane Baseball Stadium at John H. Kobs Field • East Lansing, Michigan || 8–5 || Johnson (1–2) || Henline (0–1) || Alvarado (1) || 236 || 5–14 || 5–14
|- bgcolor="#ffcccc"
| 20 || April 11 || at  || Drayton McLane Baseball Stadium at John H. Kobs Field • East Lansing, Michigan || 2–5 || Powers (2–1) || Smeltz (2–1) || Iverson (6) || 217 || 5–15 || 5–15
|- bgcolor="#ccffcc"
| 21 || April 12 || at Michigan State || Drayton McLane Baseball Stadium at John H. Kobs Field • East Lansing, Michigan || 8–2 || Brooks (2–1) || Heikkinen (0–1) || None || 201 || 6–15 || 6–15
|- bgcolor="#ccffcc"
| 22 || April 17 || vs Michigan State || Illinois Field • Champaign, Illinois || 2–1 || Smeltz (3–1) || Iverson (0–2) || None || 155 || 7–15 || 7–15
|- bgcolor="#ccffcc"
| 23 || April 18 || vs Michigan State || Illinois Field • Champaign, Illinois || 8–3 || Johnson (2–2) || Heikkinen (0–2) || None || 166 || 8–15 || 8–15
|- bgcolor="#ccffcc"
| 24 || April 18 || at  || Illinois Field • Champaign, Illinois || 6–4 || Daniel (1–1) || Kutt (0–4) || Cook (2) || 238 || 9–15 || 9–15
|- bgcolor="#ccffcc"
| 25 || April 19 || at Illinois || Illinois Field • Champaign, Illinois || 20–6 || Castro (1–0) || Maldonado (0–2) || None || 151 || 10–15 || 10–15
|- bgcolor="#ffcccc"
| 26 || April 23 || Illinois || Alexander Field • West Lafayette, Indiana || 5–6 || Hoffmann (1–0) || Schapira (0–4) || Kutt (1) || 520 || 10–16 || 10–16
|- bgcolor="#ffcccc"
| 27 || April 24 || Illinois || Alexander Field • West Lafayette, Indiana || 4–12 || Lavender (5–0) || Johnson (2–3) || Rybarczyk (2) || 537 || 10–17 || 10–17
|- bgcolor="#ffcccc"
| 28 || April 25 || Illinois || Alexander Field • West Lafayette, Indiana || 0–3 || O'Hara (2–0) || Hildebrand (1–1) || Kirschsieper (1) || 532 || 10–18 || 10–18
|- bgcolor="#ffcccc"
| 29 || April 30 || at Ohio State || Bill Davis Stadium • Columbus, Ohio || 3–11 || Burhenn (3–3) || Schapira (0–5) || None || 205 || 10–19 || 10–19
|-

|- bgcolor="#ffcccc"
| 30 || May 1 || at Ohio State || Bill Davis Stadium • Columbus, Ohio || 2–12 || Lonsway (3–4) || Johnson (2–4) || None || 305 || 10–20 || 10–20
|- bgcolor="#ccffcc"
| 31 || May 2 || at Ohio State || Bill Davis Stadium • Columbus, Ohio || 16–15 || Hildebrand (2–1) || Murphy (4–4) || Smeltz (1) || 296 || 11–20 || 11–20
|- bgcolor="#bbbbbb"
| – || May 7 || Northwestern || Alexander Field • West Lafayette, Indiana ||colspan=9| Cancelled due to COVID-19 protocols
|- bgcolor="#bbbbbb"
| – || May 8 || Northwestern || Alexander Field • West Lafayette, Indiana ||colspan=9| Cancelled due to COVID-19 protocols
|- bgcolor="#bbbbbb"
| – || May 9 || Northwestern || Alexander Field • West Lafayette, Indiana ||colspan=9| Cancelled due to COVID-19 protocols
|- bgcolor="#ffcccc"
| 32 || May 11 || Ohio State || Alexander Field • West Lafayette, Indiana || 1–5 || Burhenn (5–2) || Brooks (2–2) || None || 400 || 11–21 || 11–21
|- bgcolor="#ffcccc"
| 33 || May 14 || at Maryland || Bob "Turtle" Smith Stadium • College Park, Maryland || 0–11 || Dean (3–1) || Schapira (0–6) || None || 150 || 11–22 || 11–22
|- bgcolor="#ffcccc"
| 34 || May 15 || at Maryland || Bob "Turtle" Smith Stadium • College Park, Maryland || 1–6 || Savacool (7–1) || Johnson (2–5) || Ramsey (2) || 250 || 11–23 || 11–23
|- bgcolor="#ffcccc"
| 35 || May 16 || at Maryland || Bob "Turtle" Smith Stadium • College Park, Maryland || 2–7 || Burke (3–3) || Brooks (2–3) || Zoellner (1) || 250 || 11–24 || 11–24
|- align="center" bgcolor="#ccffcc"
| 38 || May 20 || at  || Siebert Field • Minneapolis, Minnesota || 9–3 || Schapira (1–6) || DeLuga (0–2) || None || 225 || 12–24 || 12–24
|- align="center" bgcolor="#ccffcc"
| 39 || May 21 || at Minnesota || Siebert Field • Minneapolis, Minnesota || 12–5 || Johnson (3–5) || Burchill (1–1) || None || 225 || 13–24 || 13–24
|- align="center" bgcolor="#ccffcc"
| 40 || May 22 || at Minnesota || Siebert Field • Minneapolis, Minnesota || 17–4 || Brooks (3–3) || Liffrig (1–4) || None || 225 || 14–24 || 14–24
|- align="center" bgcolor="#ffcccc"
| 41 || May 23 || at Minnesota || Siebert Field • Minneapolis, Minnesota || 8–9 || Duffy (1–4) || Weins (0–2) || None || 225 || 14–25 || 14–25
|- align="center" bgcolor="#ccffcc"
| 42 || May 27 || Penn State || Alexander Field • West Lafayette, Indiana || 7–4 || Johnson (4–5) || Larkin (3–7) || Smeltz (2) || 607 || 15–25 || 15–25
|- align="center" bgcolor="#bbbbbb"
| – || May 28 || Penn State || Alexander Field • West Lafayette, Indiana ||colspan=9| Cancelled due to weather
|- align="center" bgcolor="#ffcccc"
| 43 || May 30 || Minnesota || Alexander Field • West Lafayette, Indiana || 1–2 || Liffrig (2–4) || Brooks (3–4) || Davis (1) || 622 || 15–26 || 15–26
|- align="center" bgcolor="#ccffcc"
| 44 || May 30 || Minnesota || Alexander Field • West Lafayette, Indiana || 7–6 || Schapira (2–6) || Duffy (1–5) || None || 622 || 16–26 || 16–26
|-

Conference awards

References

Purdue
Purdue Boilermakers baseball seasons
Purdue